The 1988 Federation Cup was the 26th edition of the most important competition between national teams in women's tennis. The tournament was held at Flinders Park in Melbourne, Australia, from 4–11 December. Czechoslovakia defeated the Soviet Union in the final (in what was the first time the Soviet Union reached the semifinals since 1979), giving Czechoslovakia their 5th title, and 4th in six years.

Qualifying round 
All ties were played at Flinders Park in Melbourne, Australia, on hard courts.

Winning nations advance to Main Draw, losing nations play in consolation rounds.

China vs. Malta

Luxembourg vs. Chinese Taipei

South Korea vs. Ireland

Bulgaria vs. Philippines

Main draw

1st Round losing teams play in consolation rounds

First round

West Germany vs. Mexico

Japan vs. France

Italy vs. Poland

Israel vs. Australia

Soviet Union vs. Yugoslavia

Belgium vs. Austria

Netherlands vs. Spain

Indonesia vs. Great Britain

Czechoslovakia vs. Brazil

China vs. New Zealand

Denmark vs. Luxembourg

Greece vs. Argentina

Canada vs. South Korea

Finland vs. Hungary

Bulgaria vs. Sweden

Switzerland vs. United States

Second round

West Germany vs. France

Italy vs. Australia

Soviet Union vs. Austria

Spain vs. Indonesia

Czechoslovakia vs. New Zealand

Denmark vs. Argentina

Canada vs. Finland

Sweden vs. United States

Quarterfinals

West Germany vs. Australia

Soviet Union vs. Spain

Czechoslovakia vs. Denmark

Canada vs. Sweden

Semifinals

West Germany vs. Soviet Union

Czechoslovakia vs. Canada

Final

Soviet Union vs. Czechoslovakia

Consolation rounds

Draw

First round

Philippines vs. Ireland

Bulgaria vs. Malta

Luxembourg vs. South Korea

China vs. Chinese Taipei

Second round

Brazil vs. Hungary

Poland vs. Israel

Yugoslavia vs. Ireland

Netherlands vs. Bulgaria

South Korea vs. Japan

Greece vs. Belgium

Chinese Taipei vs. Mexico

Switzerland vs. Great Britain

Quarterfinals

Brazil vs. Israel

Yugoslavia vs. Netherlands

South Korea vs. Belgium

Chinese Taipei vs. Great Britain

Semifinals

Brazil vs. Netherlands

Belgium vs. Great Britain

Final

Netherlands vs. Great Britain

References

Billie Jean King Cups by year
Federation
Tennis tournaments in Australia
Sports competitions in Melbourne
Fed
1988 in women's tennis